Stadion u Kranjčevićevoj ulici (Kranjčević Street Stadium), also known as Stadion Concordije between 1921 and 1945, is a multi-purpose stadium located in Trešnjevka neighbourhood, in the Croatian capital of Zagreb. It is mainly used for football matches and was historically the home ground of NK Zagreb until their eviction from the ground in 2018. More recently the stadium has been the home ground for Croatian First League side NK Lokomotiva. In addition, NK Rudeš use the stadium for selected matches, particularly Croatian First League games. First opened in 1921, it has undergone many renovations and facelifts, with its current layout dating back to the 1987 Summer Universiade renovation. The Croatia national football team played only once at the stadium in a 3–0 friendly game win against South Korea on 13 March 1996. With its reduced capacity from 2008, the stadium can hold 8,850 people, which makes it the second biggest stadium in Zagreb, behind Stadion Maksimir. In 2018, the stadium was refurbished with chairs installed in the eastern grandstand and a new hybrid lawn installed, leaving it with a seating capacity of 5,350 seats.

History

The stadium at what was then called Tratinska cesta began construction in 1910s and was completed in 1921. At the time of its completion it was the biggest stadium in Zagreb and was owned by Concordia, one of the three prominent Zagreb-based football clubs in the interwar period (the other two being Građanski and HAŠK). In 1931 the first floodlit match held in Zagreb was played at the stadium, in which Zagreb XI beat Real Madrid 2–1, with two goals from Ico Hitrec and a consolation goal for Madrid scored by Eugenio.

After World War II, Concordia was disbanded for political reasons and the stadium was handed over to the newly formed Fiskulturno društvo Zagreb, whose football section later evolved into today's NK Zagreb football club. NK Zagreb's third jersey is green in honour of Concordia, whose old stadium is now their own.

In November 1977 a large fire destroyed the west stand and in the following years the stadium went through several reconstructions and modifications. The most significant of these was an extensive overhaul and the construction of the adjoining facilities in preparation for the 1987 Summer Universiade. Later that year a lightning strike destroyed the floodlights during a match between NK Zagreb and NK Osijek and the stadium was without any floodlight capabilities for 20 years, until 2008, when the new ones were re-installed by the City of Zagreb.

Croatian War of Independence

At the onset of the Croatian War of Independence one of the most significant date in the history of the stadium is the first public lineup of the Croatian National Guard, formed in April that year, consisting of members of the police and part of the Croatian army on 28 May 1991. which was the first Croatia's professional military unit and which later evolved into the Croatian Ground Army.That marked the beginning of the creation of the Croatian Armed Forces. A commemorative plaque honouring the event can be seen at the stadium entrance.

Structure

Today's shape and form of venue in Kranjčevićeva Street is due to another unfortunate event in its history. On 29 November 1977 a fire destroyed large sections of old wooden western stand of the stadium in Kranjčevićeva. Since that time, the stadium in Kranjčevićeva experienced several modifications and reconstructions in the following years. Most of infrastructure was built in the preparation of the Universiade in Zagreb, the world's Student Games held in 1987 such as extensive overhaul and the construction of the adjoining facilities. Later that same year a lightning strike wreck the floodlights and the stadium was without any floodlight capabilities for 20 years, when new ones were installed by the City of Zagreb. The stadium consists of two stands. The west stand is fully seated and can hold 3,850 spectators. It houses the press box and the VIP area. The east stand has 5,000 standing places and is mainly used for travelling fans. The stadium also has a cycling track around the pitch which is used for track cycling events. Furthermore, the stadium has a wheelchair area. In June 2008 UEFA inspection in charge of licensing have visited the stadium and gave minor praise for the stadium in the city center. Among the major cons pointed out by the UEFA inspection were lack of floodlights and poor working conditions for journalists. Even though Kranjčevićeva failed to impress the UEFA delegation due to lack of floodlights (which were installed two months later) and press box provisions it managed to receive a 3-star rating out of five, which ranks it among the better stadiums in Croatia. After infrastructure renovations which were held by the City of Zagreb through June, July and August 2008 floodlights were finally reinstalled and fully prepared three days before the 5th round and match NK Zagreb - NK Osijek played on 24 August 2008. Zagreb eventually won its first match under the floodlights at Kranjčevićeva since 1987 when they were struck by lightning during a match between NK Zagreb and the same opponent NK Osijek 2-1 thanks to goals from Mario Čutura and Davor Vugrinec in the last minute in front of 2,500 supporters. Since then, thanks to newly placed floodlights at venue in Kranjčevićeva Street, stadium is capable of playing a daylight and night matches. In 2018 the stadium was refurbished with chairs installed in the eastern grandstand and a new hybrid lawn installed. The stadium now has a seating capacity of 5,350 seats.

Average attendances

The average season attendances from league matches held at the Stadion u Kranjčevićevoj for NK Zagreb

International matches

The first international match at the stadium was held in June 1922, a friendly between Kingdom of Yugoslavia and Czechoslovakia. The Yugoslavia team consisted almost entirely of players called up from Zagreb clubs (only the goalkeeper Rodoljub Malenčić was called up from Belgrade's SK Jugoslavija) and Yugoslavia went on to win the game 4–3, with some 6,000 people in attendance. Between 1922 and 1940 the stadium hosted a total of 11 Kingdom of Yugoslavia matches, most of them friendlies. During World War II, the fascist puppet state Independent State of Croatia formed a national team which used the stadium for six games, all of them friendlies played with other Axis powers' puppet states.

In 1947 Kranjčevićeva hosted their single international game in the SFR Yugoslavia period, a 2–1 Balkan Cup win against Bulgaria, with both Yugoslavia's goals scored by Prvoslav Mihajlović. Following Croatia's independence in 1991, the Croatia national football team played at Kranjčevićeva only once, in a 1996 friendly against South Korea which Croatia won 3–0 through a hat-trick from Goran Vlaović.

List of matches

See also

List of football stadiums in Croatia

References

Sports venues in Zagreb
Football venues in Croatia
Velodromes in Croatia
Stadion Kranjceviceva
Football venues in Yugoslavia
Multi-purpose stadiums in Croatia
Sports venues completed in 1921
Stadion Kranjceviceva
NK Lokomotiva Zagreb